The Catholic Church in Morocco, Mauritania and Western Sahara (which is occupied and claimed by Morocco; all three share a Franco-Spanish colonial past) is composed only of a Latin hierarchy (no Eastern Catholic), without a single ecclesiastical province, as all are exempt, i.e. directly dependent on the Holy See, comprising:
 two non-metropolitan archbishoprics, both in Morocco;
 a bishopric for all Mauritania; and
 an apostolic prefecture for all Western Sahara.

Neither country has its own episcopal conference either, but 
 Morocco and Western Sahara are covered by the Regional Episcopal Conference of North Africa, with seat in Rabat (Morocco), which also includes states Algeria (Ecclesiastical Province of Alger), Libya and Tunisia (both entirely exempt), hence covering the Great Maghreb (western region of the Arab world) except Mauritania.
 Mauritania is covered by the Episcopal Conference of Senegal, Mauritania, Cape Verde and Guinea-Bissau, with seat in Dakar (Senegal).

There is an Apostolic Nunciature (embassy level) to Morocco (in national capital Rabat) and an Apostolic Delegation (lower level) to Mauritania (actually vested in the Apostolic Nunciature to Senegal, in its capital Dakar) as papal diplomatic representations, none for Western Sahara.

Current (Latin) dioceses

(Regional Episcopal Conference of North Africa)

Morocco 
(both exempt, not Metropolitan)
 Roman Catholic Archdiocese of Rabat
 Roman Catholic Archdiocese of Tanger

Mauritania 
 Roman Catholic Diocese of Nouakchott, exempt, for the whole country

(Regional Episcopal Conference of Senegal, Mauritania, Cape Verde and Guinea-Bissau)

Western Sahara 
 Apostolic Prefecture of Western Sahara, exempt, for the whole country

Defunct sees 
Only Morocco has two titular bishoprics, both of the episcopal (lowest) rank, being former suffragan sees, but both were suppressed as titular sees as well.
 Fez
 Marocco (now Marrakech)

All other defunct jurisdictions have current successor sees.

See also 
 Roman Catholic Diocese of Ceuta, in a Spanish enclave in Morocco

Sources and external links 
 GCatholic.org - Morocco
 GCatholic.org - Mauritania
 GCatholic.org - Western Sahara
 GCatholic.org - CERNA
 Catholic-Hierarchy entry.

Morocco
Catholic dioceses
Catholic dioceses
Catholic dioceses